Oxkutzcab is a town and the municipal seat of the Oxkutzcab Municipality, Yucatán in Mexico. As of 2015, the town has a population of 33,854. Oxkutzcab is an agricultural center, focused mainly on the production of tropical fruits such as citrus, sapote, avocado, mango, papaya, mamey, huaya, saramuyo and plums.

Demographics

Climate

References

Populated places in Yucatán
Municipality seats in Yucatán